XPostFacto is an open source utility that enables the installation of PowerPC versions of Mac OS X up to Mac OS X v10.4 (Tiger), and Darwin on some PowerPC-based Apple Macintosh systems that are not officially supported for them by Apple.

External links 
Official XPostFacto site

Free system software